Gymnostachys is a monotypic genus, of the monocotyledon plant family Araceae.

The sole known species Gymnostachys anceps, commonly named settler's twine or boorgay, grows naturally in rainforests and humid Eucalypt forests of eastern New South Wales and eastern Queensland, Australia.

Gymnostachys is kept to its own subfamily Gymnostachydoideae due to its unique characteristics that include an unusually structured flowering shoot and linear leaves with parallel venation.

References

Mayo, S.J., Bogner, J., and Boyce, J.C. (1998) The genera of Araceae project, Acta Botanica Yunnanica.
Bown, Deni (2000). Aroids: Plants of the Arum Family [ILLUSTRATED]. Timber Press. 

Monotypic Araceae genera
Flora of New South Wales
Flora of Queensland
Monocots of Australia
Araceae